Shaurya is a Hindi given name and surname. Notable people with the name include:

Shaurya Chauhan (born 1977), Indian model, actress and TV host
Shaurya Sanandia (born 1987), Indian cricketer
Shelly Shaurya (born 1993), Indian cricketer

Indian given names
Indian surnames